The 2018 Commonwealth Heads of Government Meeting, also known as CHOGM 2018, was the 25th Meeting of the Heads of Government of the Commonwealth of Nations. It was held in the United Kingdom. The meeting had been planned to have been held by Vanuatu at the end of 2017, but was moved to the United Kingdom after the impact of Cyclone Pam on the infrastructure of Vanuatu. The meeting was then postponed to April 2018 due to other international commitments.

The position of Commonwealth Chair-in-Office, held by the government leader of the CHOGM host country, was transferred at the summit from the Prime Minister of Malta to the Prime Minister of the United Kingdom, who held the post until the 26th CHOGM in 2022.

Agenda

The theme of the summit was "Towards a Common Future". The British hosts set out four main goals for the summit:

prosperity: boosting intra-Commonwealth trade and investment
security: increasing cooperation across security challenges including global terrorism, organised crime and cyber attacks
fairness: promoting democracy, fundamental freedoms and good governance across the Commonwealth
sustainability: building the resilience of small and vulnerable states to deal with the effects of climate change and other global crises

Under consideration were: A Commonwealth Blue Charter on ocean governance, a Commonwealth connectivity agenda for trade and investment, a declaration on cybercrime, and revised Commonwealth guidelines on election observation in member countries.

Trade
This was the first CHOGM held following the United Kingdom's decision to withdraw from the European Union, a decision which has resulted in calls for Britain to strengthen its economic ties with and play a greater role in the Commonwealth. The Commonwealth, as of 2018, was responsible for one-tenth of British trade compare to the EU with which the UK currently conducts half of its trade. Intra-Commonwealth trade, overall, is expected to increase by at least 17% to around US$700 billion by 2020.

The British government reportedly hoped to use the CHOGM to open negotiations for expanded trade with Commonwealth nations to replace lost trade with the EU, however, as the summit began The Economist dismissed the belief that the Commonwealth could fill the gap created by Brexit as “an amiable delusion”.

Head of the Commonwealth and the Royal Family
The succession of the Headship of the Commonwealth,
and the roles of other members of the Royal Family was discussed, and a proposal to nominate Queen Elizabeth II for the Nobel Peace Prize was also expected to feature in discussions.

At a speech welcoming Commonwealth leaders to Buckingham Palace on the first day of the summit, the Queen said "It is my sincere wish that the Commonwealth will continue to offer stability and continuity for future generations, and will decide that one day the Prince of Wales should carry on the important work started by my father in 1949."

On 20 April, the second day of the summit, the Commonwealth leaders agreed that Prince Charles would succeed the Queen as Head of the Commonwealth.

LGBT rights
The British government was accused by LGBT activists of backing away from plans to make LGBT rights in the Commonwealth of Nations an issue during the summit. Homosexuality remains a criminal offence in 37 out of 53 Commonwealth states. LGBT-rights campaigners from the UK and across the Commonwealth picketed Marlborough House, the headquarters of the Commonwealth Secretariat, on 19 April in order to draw attention to the issue. UK Prime Minister Theresa May said in a speech to Commonwealth leaders that she "deeply regrets" Britain's role in having same-sex conduct criminalized in colonial laws that remain in force in many Commonwealth countries, saying of these laws that “They were wrong then and they are wrong now” and that the UK government supports the reform of these laws in former colonies.

Commonwealth Clean Oceans Alliance
The UK promised to spend £61m to combat the pollution of the world's oceans by plastics and announced that it would ban plastic straws, microbeads, and other waste and to help developing countries curb plastics and other environmental pollutants from contaminating the oceans, and urged other Commonwealth countries to do the same. Five countries have joined the Commonwealth Clean Oceans Alliance: the UK, New Zealand, Sri Lanka, Vanuatu and Ghana.

Commonwealth Cyber Declaration
The Commonwealth unanimously adopted the Commonwealth Cyber Declaration with leaders agreeing to work closely to strengthen their cybersecurity frameworks and response mechanisms by 2020.

Participants

Of the 53 Commonwealth member countries, 19 were presented by the respective heads of state (1 Sultan and 18 Presidents), 28 countries by their respective heads of government including the host country, 2 by their respective deputy heads of state, 1 by their deputy head of government, 1 by the presiding officer of the national legislature, and remaining 2 by their foreign ministers.

The Commonwealth was represented by the presence of Queen Elizabeth II as Head of the Commonwealth and Charles, Prince of Wales while the Commonwealth Secretariat was represented by the Secretary-General Patricia Scotland. 

 Queen Elizabeth II, Head of the Commonwealth
 Patricia Scotland, Secretary-General of the Commonwealth
 Gaston Browne, Prime Minister of Antigua and Barbuda
 Malcolm Turnbull, Prime Minister of Australia
 Hubert Minnis, Prime Minister of the Bahamas
 Sheikh Hasina, Prime Minister of Bangladesh
 Maxine McClean, Minister of Foreign Affairs and Foreign Trade of Barbados
 Wilfred Elrington, Minister of Foreign Affairs and Home Affairs of Belize
 Mokgweetsi Masisi, President of Botswana
 Sultan Hassanal Bolkiah, Sultan and Prime Minister of Brunei
 Philémon Yang, Prime Minister of Cameroon
 Justin Trudeau, Prime Minister of Canada
 Nicos Anastasiades, President of Cyprus
 Roosevelt Skerrit, Prime Minister of Dominica
 Frank Bainimarama, Prime Minister of Fiji
 Adama Barrow, President of The Gambia
 Nana Akufo-Addo, President of Ghana
 Keith Mitchell, Prime Minister of Grenada
 David A. Granger, President of Guyana
 Narendra Modi, Prime Minister of India
 Andrew Holness, Prime Minister of Jamaica
 Uhuru Kenyatta, President of Kenya
 Taneti Maamau, President of Kiribati
 Tom Thabane, Prime Minister of Lesotho
 Peter Mutharika, Prime Minister of Malawi
 Tan Sri Dato' Sri Vigneswaran Sanasee, President of Dewan Negara of Malaysia
 Joseph Muscat, Prime Minister of Malta
 Pravind Jugnauth, Prime Minister of Mauritius
 Filipe Nyusi, President of Mozambique
 Hage Geingob, President of Namibia
 Baron Waqa, President of Nauru
 Jacinda Ardern, Prime Minister of New Zealand
 Muhammadu Buhari, President of Nigeria
 Shahid Khaqan Abbasi, Prime Minister of Pakistan
 Peter O'Neill, Prime Minister of Papua New Guinea
 Paul Kagame, President of Rwanda
 Timothy Harris, Prime Minister of Saint Kitts and Nevis
 Allen Chastanet, Prime Minister of Saint Lucia
 Sir Louis Straker, Deputy Prime Minister of Saint Vincent and the Grenadines
 Tuilaʻepa Saʻilele Malielegaoi, Prime Minister of Samoa
 Danny Faure, President of Seychelles
 Julius Maada Bio, President of Sierra Leone
 Lee Hsien Loong, Prime Minister of Singapore
 Rick Houenipwela, Prime Minister of Solomon Islands
 Cyril Ramaphosa, President of South Africa
 Maithripala Sirisena, President of Sri Lanka
 Barnabas Sibusiso Dlamini, Prime Minister of Swaziland
 Samia Suluhu, Vice President of Tanzania
 ʻAkilisi Pōhiva, Prime Minister of Tonga
 Keith Rowley, Prime Minister of Trinidad and Tobago
 Enele Sopoaga, Prime Minister of Tuvalu
 Yoweri Museveni, President of Uganda
 Theresa May, Prime Minister of the United Kingdom (Chair)
 Charlot Salwai, Prime Minister of Vanuatu
 Inonge Wina, Vice President of Zambia

Outcomes
The leaders issued a Communiqué at the close of the summit in which they: 
committed their countries to ratifying and implementing the Convention on the Elimination of All Forms of Discrimination Against Women, 
"mainstream youth priorities into national development policies and plans", 
"address the stigma around disability in all its forms and manifestations",  
agreed to Report of the Commonwealth Ministerial Action Group on the Commonwealth's fundamental political values, 
adopted the Revised Commonwealth Guidelines on Election Observation in Member Countries 
called for strengthening the international response to the large movement of refugees, including return to their country of origin in safety and dignity 
"adopted a Declaration on the Commonwealth Connectivity Agenda for Trade and Investment and mandated the Secretariat to develop an accompanying action plan that considers capacity building and hard and soft connectivity" 
adopted the Commonwealth Blue Charter on sustainable development and protection of the world's oceans 
adopted a Commonwealth Cyber Declaration that "reflects Commonwealth values, and sets out a common commitment to an open, democratic peaceful and secure internet, respecting human rights and freedom of expression" 
called for a strengthening of the implementation of the Chemical Weapons Convention 
agreed to work together to combat climate change – particularly with reference to "small island developing states"
to coordinate efforts countering extremism as well as human trafficking.
agreed that Rwanda will host the next CHOGM in 2020 and that Samoa would host the CHOGM 2022.

The leaders also issued a statement announcing their decision that Prince Charles would be the next Head of the Commonwealth.

Commonwealth Forums

Parallel Commonwealth Summit Forums were held at the Queen Elizabeth II Conference Centre from 16 to 19 April, with 5,000 participants attending from government, business, and civil society engaged in Women's, Youth, and Peoples Forums with a Business Forum being held at Guildhall. A joint plenary of all four fora was held for the first time on 17 April.

The Commonwealth Summit Forums saw participation from a number of Commonwealth heads of government and ministers. UK Prime Minister Theresa May opened the Business Forum on 16 April 2018  and South African President Cyril Ramaphosa delivered a keynote address at the Business Forum Banquet.

Various members of the royal family—including The Prince of Wales and the Duchess of Cornwall; Prince William, Duke of Cambridge, and the Duke and Duchess of Sussex— hosted and participated in various receptions and events being held as part of the forums or the heads of government meeting itself. Prince Harry, in his new role as Commonwealth Youth Ambassador, opened the Youth Forum telling delegates: "In my new role, I will work to support the Queen, my father the Prince of Wales, and my brother William, all of whom know that young people are the answer to the challenges of today."

On the final day of the meeting, Prince Harry and Meghan Markle attended a reception to promote women's empowerment and girls' education.

References

External links
CHOGM 2018 Communiqué

2018
2018 in politics
Diplomatic conferences in the United Kingdom
The Gambia and the Commonwealth of Nations
Zimbabwe and the Commonwealth of Nations
21st-century diplomatic conferences (Commonwealth)
2018 in international relations
2018 conferences
United Kingdom and the Commonwealth of Nations
2018 in the Gambia
2018 in the United Kingdom
2018 in Zimbabwe
April 2018 events in the United Kingdom
2010s in the City of Westminster
2018 in London